Enaphalodes atomarius is a species of beetle in the family Cerambycidae. It was described by Dru Drury in 1773 from New York City.

Description
Head brownish black, covered with short yellowish-grey pile. Thorax dirty black, covered with yellow-grey pile; cylindrical, and without any spines or risings. Antennae dusky brown; having a spine on each joint, except that next to the head, and about the length of the insect. Scutellum very small. Elytra black, mottled with yellow grey; being margined at the sides and suture, and not reaching or covering the anus, each having two spines at the extremity. Abdomen and breast greyish brown, as are the legs, each of which is furnished with a spine at the tip of the tibiae. Length of body  inch (17 mm).

References

Elaphidiini
Beetles described in 1773
Descriptions from Illustrations of Exotic Entomology
Taxa named by Dru Drury